Health (formerly In Health) was an American magazine focused on women's health and owned by Dotdash Meredith. The magazine's topics range from improper diet to dealing with life issues such as weak relationships and growing stress. Additionally, this website offers latest fashion and exclusive beauty tips, various healthy food recipes, and related articles that can encourage people to be happy and healthy. Since 1999, Health has published its annual beauty awards, highlighting top products in health categories like skincare. It occasionally features cover stories on celebrities such as Marcia Cross and Elisabeth Röhm and tips from Bethenny Frankel, a celebrity chef.

Since 2017, the publication has been helmed by Lori Leibovich, who has attempted to remake the magazine into a digitally-focused health vertical.

News rating site NewsGuard rates the publication as reliable, noting that it generally avoids deceptive headlines and does not repeatedly publish false content, though it also notes that the website does not always clearly separate sponsored content from original writing.

In 2019, Health launched Balance by Health, a Facebook chatbot and a 360-brand platform Wellness Warriors.

In November 2019, Meredith Corporation announced that it was investing more in the magazine. Meredith Corporation also announced that Cheryl Brown was joining the magazine as its executive editor. In 2021, the Meredith Corporation would be acquired by IAC. 

In February 2022, it was revealed that Health would end print publications and switch to an all digital format.

References

External links
 Health Magazine Official Website

Health magazines
Lifestyle magazines published in the United States
Magazines established in 1981
Mass media in Des Moines, Iowa
Magazines published in Iowa
Monthly magazines published in the United States
Southern Progress Corporation
Women's magazines published in the United States
IAC (company)